Ilyinka is the name of several inhabited localities in Russia.

Modern localities

Altai Krai
As of 2012, two rural localities in Altai Krai bear this name:
Ilyinka, Shelabolikhinsky District, Altai Krai, a selo in Ilyinsky Selsoviet of Shelabolikhinsky District; 
Ilyinka, Shipunovsky District, Altai Krai, a selo in Ilyinsky Selsoviet of Shipunovsky District;

Altai Republic
As of 2012, one rural locality in the Altai Republic bears this name:
Ilyinka, Altai Republic, a selo in Ilyinskoye Rural Settlement of Shebalinsky District;

Astrakhan Oblast
As of 2012, two inhabited localities in Astrakhan Oblast bear this name:

Urban localities
Ilyinka, Ikryaninsky District, Astrakhan Oblast, a work settlement in Ikryaninsky District; 

Rural localities
Ilyinka, Volodarsky District, Astrakhan Oblast, a selo in Bolshemogoysky Selsoviet of Volodarsky District;

Republic of Bashkortostan
As of 2012, two rural localities in the Republic of Bashkortostan bear this name:
Ilyinka, Blagovarsky District, Republic of Bashkortostan, a village in Blagovarsky Selsoviet of Blagovarsky District; 
Ilyinka, Uchalinsky District, Republic of Bashkortostan, a village in Mansurovsky Selsoviet of Uchalinsky District

Belgorod Oblast
As of 2012, two rural localities in Belgorod Oblast bear this name:
Ilyinka, Alexeyevsky District, Belgorod Oblast, a selo in Alexeyevsky District
Ilyinka, Gubkinsky District, Belgorod Oblast, a khutor in Gubkinsky District

Bryansk Oblast
As of 2012, one rural locality in Bryansk Oblast bears this name:
Ilyinka, Bryansk Oblast, a settlement in Degtyarevsky Rural Administrative Okrug of Surazhsky District;

Republic of Buryatia
As of 2012, one rural locality in the Republic of Buryatia bears this name:
Ilyinka, Republic of Buryatia, a selo in Ilyinsky Selsoviet of Pribaykalsky District

Chelyabinsk Oblast
As of 2012, one rural locality in Chelyabinsk Oblast bears this name:
Ilyinka, Chelyabinsk Oblast, a settlement in Granitny Selsoviet of Kizilsky District

Chuvash Republic
As of 2012, one rural locality in the Chuvash Republic bears this name:
Ilyinka, Chuvash Republic, a selo in Ilyinskoye Rural Settlement of Morgaushsky District

Republic of Crimea
As of 2012, two rural localities in Republic of Crimea bear this name:
Ilyinka, Krasnoperekopsky District, Republic of Crimea, a selo in Krasnoperekopsky District
Ilyinka, Saksky District, Republic of Crimea, a selo in Saksky District

Kaluga Oblast
As of 2012, six rural localities in Kaluga Oblast bear this name:
Ilyinka, Kaluga, Kaluga Oblast, a village under the administrative jurisdiction of the City of Kaluga
Ilyinka, Khvastovichsky District, Kaluga Oblast, a selo in Khvastovichsky District
Ilyinka (Peredel Rural Settlement), Medynsky District, Kaluga Oblast, a village in Medynsky District; municipally, a part of Peredel Rural Settlement of that district
Ilyinka (Kremenskoye Rural Settlement), Medynsky District, Kaluga Oblast, a village in Medynsky District; municipally, a part of Kremenskoye Rural Settlement of that district
Ilyinka, Meshchovsky District, Kaluga Oblast, a village in Meshchovsky District
Ilyinka, Peremyshlsky District, Kaluga Oblast, a selo in Peremyshlsky District

Kemerovo Oblast
As of 2012, two rural localities in Kemerovo Oblast bear this name:
Ilyinka, Mezhdurechensky District, Kemerovo Oblast, a settlement in Mezhdurechensky District; 
Ilyinka, Novokuznetsky District, Kemerovo Oblast, a selo in Ilyinskaya Rural Territory of Novokuznetsky District;

Khabarovsk Krai
As of 2012, one rural locality in Khabarovsk Krai bears this name:
Ilyinka, Khabarovsk Krai, a selo in Khabarovsky District

Kirov Oblast
As of 2012, one rural locality in Kirov Oblast bears this name:
Ilyinka, Kirov Oblast, a village in Shkalansky Rural Okrug of Yaransky District;

Kostroma Oblast
As of 2012, one rural locality in Kostroma Oblast bears this name:
Ilyinka, Kostroma Oblast, a village in Georgiyevskoye Settlement of Mezhevskoy District;

Krasnoyarsk Krai
As of 2012, seven rural localities in Krasnoyarsk Krai bear this name:
Ilyinka, Achinsky District, Krasnoyarsk Krai, a village in Malinovsky Selsoviet of Achinsky District
Ilyinka, Bogotolsky District, Krasnoyarsk Krai, a village in Vaginsky Selsoviet of Bogotolsky District
Ilyinka, Kuraginsky District, Krasnoyarsk Krai, a village in Shalobolinsky Selsoviet of Kuraginsky District
Ilyinka, Nazarovsky District, Krasnoyarsk Krai, a selo in Preobrazhensky Selsoviet of Nazarovsky District
Ilyinka, Alexandrovsky Selsoviet, Nizhneingashsky District, Krasnoyarsk Krai, a village in Alexandrovsky Selsoviet of Nizhneingashsky District
Ilyinka, Stretensky Selsoviet, Nizhneingashsky District, Krasnoyarsk Krai, a village in Stretensky Selsoviet of Nizhneingashsky District
Ilyinka, Uzhursky District, Krasnoyarsk Krai, a selo in Ilyinsky Selsoviet of Uzhursky District

Kurgan Oblast
As of 2012, one rural locality in Kurgan Oblast bears this name:
Ilyinka, Kurgan Oblast, a village under the administrative jurisdiction of the urban-type settlement under district jurisdiction of Yurgamysh in Yurgamyshsky District;

Kursk Oblast
As of 2012, one rural locality in Kursk Oblast bears this name:
Ilyinka, Kursk Oblast, a selo in Donsemitsky Selsoviet of Pristensky District

Lipetsk Oblast
As of 2012, six rural localities in Lipetsk Oblast bear this name:
Ilyinka, Dankovsky District, Lipetsk Oblast, a village in Speshnevo-Ivanovsky Selsoviet of Dankovsky District; 
Ilyinka, Dolgorukovsky Selsoviet, Dolgorukovsky District, Lipetsk Oblast, a village in Dolgorukovsky Selsoviet of Dolgorukovsky District; 
Ilyinka, Svishensky Selsoviet, Dolgorukovsky District, Lipetsk Oblast, a village in Svishensky Selsoviet of Dolgorukovsky District; 
Ilyinka, Krasninsky District, Lipetsk Oblast, a village in Krasninsky Selsoviet of Krasninsky District; 
Ilyinka, Lev-Tolstovsky District, Lipetsk Oblast, a selo in Novochemodanovsky Selsoviet of Lev-Tolstovsky District; 
Ilyinka, Yeletsky District, Lipetsk Oblast, a village in Maloboyevsky Selsoviet of Yeletsky District;

Mari El Republic
As of 2012, two rural localities in the Mari El Republic bear this name:
Ilyinka, Markovsky Rural Okrug, Orshansky District, Mari El Republic, a village in Markovsky Rural Okrug of Orshansky District; 
Ilyinka, Velikopolsky Rural Okrug, Orshansky District, Mari El Republic, a settlement in Velikopolsky Rural Okrug of Orshansky District;

Nizhny Novgorod Oblast
As of 2012, four rural localities in Nizhny Novgorod Oblast bear this name:
Ilyinka, Chkalovsky District, Nizhny Novgorod Oblast, a village in Purekhovsky Selsoviet of Chkalovsky District; 
Ilyinka, Sechenovsky District, Nizhny Novgorod Oblast, a selo in Boltinsky Selsoviet of Sechenovsky District; 
Ilyinka (settlement), Sokolsky District, Nizhny Novgorod Oblast, a settlement in Volzhsky Selsoviet of Sokolsky District; 
Ilyinka (village), Sokolsky District, Nizhny Novgorod Oblast, a village in Volzhsky Selsoviet of Sokolsky District;

Novosibirsk Oblast
As of 2012, three rural localities in Novosibirsk Oblast bear this name:
Ilyinka, Dovolensky District, Novosibirsk Oblast, a selo in Dovolensky District; 
Ilyinka, Kuybyshevsky District, Novosibirsk Oblast, a settlement in Kuybyshevsky District; 
Ilyinka, Vengerovsky District, Novosibirsk Oblast, a village in Vengerovsky District;

Omsk Oblast
As of 2012, one rural locality in Omsk Oblast bears this name:
Ilyinka, Omsk Oblast, a village in Nikolsky Rural Okrug of Tyukalinsky District;

Orenburg Oblast
As of 2012, two rural localities in Orenburg Oblast bear this name:
Ilyinka, Kuvandyksky District, Orenburg Oblast, a selo in Ilyinsky Selsoviet of Kuvandyksky District
Ilyinka, Oktyabrsky District, Orenburg Oblast, a selo in Ilyinsky Selsoviet of Oktyabrsky District

Oryol Oblast
As of 2012, one rural locality in Oryol Oblast bears this name:
Ilyinka, Oryol Oblast, a village in Vasilyevsky Selsoviet of Verkhovsky District;

Primorsky Krai
As of 2012, two rural localities in Khankaysky District of Primorsky Krai bear this name:
Ilyinka (railway station), a railway station
Ilyinka (selo), a selo

Rostov Oblast
As of 2012, one rural locality in Rostov Oblast bears this name:
Ilyinka, Rostov Oblast, a khutor in Ilyinskoye Rural Settlement of Belokalitvinsky District;

Ryazan Oblast
As of 2012, one rural locality in Ryazan Oblast bears this name:
Ilyinka, Ryazan Oblast, a selo in Ilyinsky Rural Okrug of Skopinsky District

Samara Oblast
As of 2012, one rural locality in Samara Oblast bears this name:
Ilyinka, Samara Oblast, a settlement in Krasnoyarsky District

Saratov Oblast
As of 2012, three rural localities in Saratov Oblast bear this name:
Ilyinka, Dergachyovsky District, Saratov Oblast, a settlement in Dergachyovsky District
Ilyinka, Krasnokutsky District, Saratov Oblast, a selo in Krasnokutsky District
Ilyinka, Turkovsky District, Saratov Oblast, a selo in Turkovsky District

Smolensk Oblast
As of 2012, one rural locality in Smolensk Oblast bears this name:
Ilyinka, Smolensk Oblast, a village in Snegirevskoye Rural Settlement of Shumyachsky District

Tambov Oblast
As of 2012, two rural localities in Tambov Oblast bear this name:
Ilyinka, Umyotsky District, Tambov Oblast, a village in Sergiyevsky Selsoviet of Umyotsky District
Ilyinka, Znamensky District, Tambov Oblast, a village in Pokrovo-Marfinsky Selsoviet of Znamensky District

Republic of Tatarstan
As of 2012, one rural locality in the Republic of Tatarstan bears this name:
Ilyinka, Republic of Tatarstan, a village under the administrative jurisdiction of the city of republic significance of Nizhnekamsk

Tula Oblast
As of 2012, five rural localities in Tula Oblast bear this name:
Ilyinka, Arsenyevsky District, Tula Oblast, a village in Bobrovsky Rural Okrug of Arsenyevsky District
Ilyinka, Chernsky District, Tula Oblast, a village in Bolsheskuratovskaya Rural Administration of Chernsky District
Ilyinka, Leninsky District, Tula Oblast, a settlement in Ilyinsky Rural Okrug of Leninsky District
Ilyinka, Uzlovsky District, Tula Oblast, a selo in Akimo-Ilyinskaya Rural Administration of Uzlovsky District
Ilyinka, Venyovsky District, Tula Oblast, a village in Mordvessky Rural Okrug of Venyovsky District

Tuva Republic
As of 2012, one rural locality in the Tuva Republic bears this name:
Ilyinka, Tuva Republic, a selo in Ilyinka Sumon (Rural Settlement) of Kaa-Khemsky District

Tver Oblast
As of 2012, one rural locality in Tver Oblast bears this name:
Ilyinka, Tver Oblast, a village in Kiverichi Rural Settlement of Rameshkovsky District

Tyumen Oblast
As of 2012, one rural locality in Tyumen Oblast bears this name:
Ilyinka, Tyumen Oblast, a selo in Ilyinsky Rural Okrug of Kazansky District

Voronezh Oblast
As of 2012, two rural localities in Voronezh Oblast bear this name:
Ilyinka, Kalacheyevsky District, Voronezh Oblast, a selo in Podgorenskoye Rural Settlement of Kalacheyevsky District
Ilyinka, Talovsky District, Voronezh Oblast, a settlement in Kazanskoye Rural Settlement of Talovsky District

Yaroslavl Oblast
As of 2012, one rural locality in Yaroslavl Oblast bears this name:
Ilyinka, Yaroslavl Oblast, a village in Ryazantsevsky Rural Okrug of Pereslavsky District

Zabaykalsky Krai
As of 2012, one rural locality in Zabaykalsky Krai bears this name:
Ilyinka, Zabaykalsky Krai, a selo in Chitinsky District

Alternative names
Ilyinka, alternative name of Ilyinki, a village in Lozovskoye Rural Settlement of Sergiyevo-Posadsky District in Moscow Oblast; 
Ilyinka, alternative name of Ilyinskoye, a selo in Ilyinsky Rural Okrug of Kushchyovsky District in Krasnodar Krai; 
Ilyinka, alternative name of Ilyinskoye, a selo in Ilyinsky Selsoviet of Kataysky District in Kurgan Oblast; 
Ilyinka, alternative name of Nizhnyaya Ilyinka, a village in Krasnoyarsky Rural Okrug of Omsky District in Omsk Oblast; 
Ilyinka, alternative name of Zelenaya, a village in Talbakulsky Rural Okrug of Kolosovsky District in Omsk Oblast;

See also
Ilya (disambiguation)
Ilyin
Ilyino
Ilyinsky (inhabited locality)

Notes